Sebastian Newbold Coe, Baron Coe,  (born 29 September 1956), often referred to as Seb Coe, is a British politician and former track and field athlete. As a middle-distance runner, Coe won four Olympic medals, including  1500 metres gold medals at the Olympic Games in 1980 and 1984. He set nine outdoor and three indoor world records in middle-distance track events – including, in 1979, setting three world records in the space of 41 days – and the world record he set in the 800 metres in 1981 remained unbroken until 1997. Coe's rivalries with fellow Britons Steve Ovett and Steve Cram dominated middle-distance racing for much of the 1980s.

Following Coe's retirement from athletics, he was a Conservative  member of parliament from 1992 to 1997 for Falmouth and Camborne in Cornwall, and became a Life Peer on 16 May 2000.

He headed the successful London 2012 Olympic bid for the 2012 Summer Olympics and became chairman of the London Organising Committee for the Olympic Games. In 2007, he was elected a vice-president of the International Association of Athletics Federations (IAAF), and re-elected for another four-year term in 2011. In August 2015, he was elected president of the IAAF.

In 2012, Coe was appointed Pro-Chancellor of Loughborough University where he had been an undergraduate, and he is also a member of the university's governing body. He was one of 24 athletes inducted as inaugural members of the IAAF Hall of Fame. In November 2012, he was appointed chairman of the British Olympic Association. Coe was presented with the Lifetime Achievement award at the BBC Sports Personality of the Year in December 2012.

Early life and education
Coe was born on 29 September 1956 at Queen Charlotte's and Chelsea Hospital, Hammersmith, London. His father was athletics coach Peter Coe and his mother, Tina Angela Lal, was of half Indian descent, born to a Punjabi father, Sardari Lal Malhotra, and an English/Irish mother (née Swan).

When he was less than a year old, Coe and his family moved to Warwickshire, where he later attended Bridgetown Primary School and Hugh Clopton Secondary School in Stratford-upon-Avon. The family then moved to Sheffield where he attended Tapton School, a secondary modern school, at Crosspool which became a comprehensive school while he was there and Abbeydale Grange School. He joined Hallamshire Harriers at the age of 12, and soon became a middle-distance specialist, having been inspired by David Jackson, a geography teacher at Tapton School who had been a cross-country runner. Coe was coached by his own father and represented Loughborough University and later Enfield and Haringey Athletic Club when not competing for his country.

Coe studied Economics and Social History at Loughborough University and won his first major race in 1977—an 800 metres event at the European indoor championships in San Sebastián, Spain. At Loughborough University he met an athletics coach, George Gandy, who developed "revolutionary" conditioning exercises to improve Coe's running.

His mother, Tina Angela Lal, died in London, in 2005, aged 75. His father, Peter Coe, died on 9 August 2008, aged 88, while Coe was visiting Beijing.

Athletics career
 Coe first caught the public's attention on 14 March 1977 when he competed in the 800m at the European Indoor Championships in San Sebastián, front-running the entire race and winning in 1:46.54, just short of the world indoor record. He ran in the Emsley Carr mile on 29 August 1977, outsprinting Filbert Bayi of Tanzania in the home straight and winning in 3:57.7. Eleven days later, on 9 September 1977, he ran the 800m at the Coca-Cola Games at Crystal Palace in a time of 1:44.95, beating Andy Carter's 1:45.12 to claim his first UK national outdoor record.

Coe's 1978 season continued to show his progression in the middle distances, though he raced only sparingly, as in early June he had  suffered a serious ankle injury whilst out on a training run. On 18 August 1978, he ran the 800m at the Ivo Van Damme Memorial meeting in Brussels, where he far outclassed the field and stormed home in a time of 1:44.25, another UK national record.

He first ran against his great rival Steve Ovett in a schools cross country race in 1972. Neither won, nor did either win in their first major encounter, on 31 August 1978, in the 800m at the European Championships in Prague.  Ovett took second, breaking Coe's UK record with a time of 1:44.09, and Coe finished third; the race was won by the East German Olaf Beyer. According to Pat Butcher, Coe's father and coach Peter Coe had encouraged him to run as fast as he could from the start. The early pace was indeed exceptionally fast: Coe ran 200m in 24.3, 400m in 49.32, and 600m in 1:16.2; he then slowed and finished third in 1:44.76. A few weeks later, Coe reclaimed the UK record at Crystal Palace, setting an all-comers' mark of 1:43.97 which ranked him second in the world that year. On 1 October 1978, Coe displayed to the world for the first time his phenomenal natural endurance by winning the Loughrea 4-Mile road race in Ireland in 17:54, defeating the likes of Eamonn Coghlan (who would win the 5000m at the 1983 World Championships) and Mike McLeod (who would be the 1984 Olympic 10,000m silver medalist), and breaking Brendan Foster's course record of 18:05. All this off a season which had been focussed on 800m, with only one race at 1500m or the mile. This was a warning to the world's top milers of what was to happen the following summer.

The next year, 1979, Coe set three world records in 41 days. He set the first two in Oslo, Norway, at 800m (1:42.33) and the mile (3:48.95), then broke the world 1500m record with his 3:32.03 in Zurich, Switzerland, becoming the first person to hold these three records at the same time. He easily won the 800m at the European Cup in Turin in August, covering the last 200m in 24.1, and anchored the British 4 × 400m relay team with the quartet's fastest split, 45.5. He was voted Athlete of the Year by Athletics Weekly and Track and Field News and was ranked number one in the world at 800m and 1500m; no other athlete since has ranked number one at these distances in the same year.

In 1980, Coe broke Rick Wohlhuter's world record for 1000m with a time of 2:13.40. He held all four middle-distance world records—the 800m, 1000m, 1500m, and mile—simultaneously (another unique feat) for one hour until Ovett broke his mile record. In the 1980 Olympics in Moscow, Ovett and Coe each won the other's speciality: Ovett the 800m and Coe the 1500m. Coe took second in the 800m after running what he described as "the worst tactical race of my life", while Ovett took third in the 1500. It was Ovett's first defeat at one mile or 1500m in three years and 45 races. Coe covered the last 400m in 52.2 and the last 100m in 12.1 seconds, the fastest-ever finish in a championship final at this distance.

Coe began 1981 with an indoor world record of 1:46.0 for 800m at Cosford in February. On 10 June, he set a world 800m record in Florence; his 1:41.73 remained unbeaten until August 1997. As of 2022, his time still stands as the UK record and puts him in a tie with Nijel Amos for third-fastest man ever at the distance. A month afterwards he set another world record with 2:12.18 for 1000m, which was to last 19 years and to this day (2022) has only been bettered once. At this time, Coe was more than 1.7 seconds (about 14m) faster than anyone in history at both distances. Between these two record-breaking runs he won the Europa Cup 800m semifinal, running the last 100m in 11.3 (the fastest final 100m ever recorded in a major international race), and achieved a personal best of 3:31.95 at 1500m, despite dreadful pacemaking (he went through 400m in 52.4 and 800m in 1:49.1, the fastest start ever in an international 1500m race at the time) by US 800m runner James Robinson, who passed 400m in 51.5. In August, Coe won the gold medal over 800m at the European Cup final with a blistering last 200m in 24.6 and last 100m in 11.9.  He then bettered the standard for the mile twice, first with 3:48.53 in Zürich and then with 3:47.33 in Brussels, on either side of Ovett's world record in Koblenz (3:48.40). His 3:47.33 remained on the all-time top-10 list until 31 May 2014.

Coe ended the season with gold over 800m at the World Cup in Rome in September with 1:46.16 (and a 12.0 last 100m), and remained undefeated at both 1500m/mile and 800m for the entire season, as he had in 1979. Track & Field News and Athletics Weekly magazines voted Coe Athlete of the Year, an honour he had also won in 1979. Although he had a short season in 1982 because of injuries in June and July, Coe still managed to rank number one in the world in the 800m and to participate in a world-record 4 x 800m relay. Coe, Peter Elliott, Garry Cook and Steve Cram ran a time of 7:03.89, which would remain the world record for 24 years. Coe's leg was the fastest of the day, a solo 1:44.01. Heavily favored for the 800m at the 1982 European Championships in Athletics in Athens, he  unexpectedly finished second; the next day British team doctors revealed that he had been suffering from glandular fever. Coe decided to withdraw from the 1500 metres in those championships.

Coe began 1983 with world indoor records at 800m in Cosford, England (1:44.91, breaking his own 1:46.0 from 1981) and 1000m (2:18.58) in Oslo, but he spent much of that year battling health problems, including a prolonged bout with toxoplasmosis. He missed the inaugural IAAF World Championships in Athletics. The disease was severe, and he spent several months in and out of hospital. He returned to competition in 1984 and was selected at 800m and 1500m for the 1984 Olympic Games in Los Angeles, despite having been narrowly beaten by Peter Elliott in the AAA Championships. In the 800m he took silver behind Joaquim Cruz of Brazil, but in the 1500m final—his seventh race in nine days—he took the gold in an Olympic record of 3:32.53. He ran the last 800m of the race in 1:49.8, the last lap in 53.2, and the last 100m in 12.7. He remains the only man to win successive Olympic 1500m titles.

Coe had planned to have a somewhat quiet season in 1985, partly because of the intensity of the previous year's efforts to get himself ready in time for the Olympics, as well as a planned move up to 5000m, which never materialised. He suffered a recurrence of a back problem which had plagued him on and off since 1980; this caused him to miss several weeks of midseason training. He nevertheless managed to run some fast times towards the end of the season, but he lost his mile world record to Cram, who beat him in Oslo. In 1986, Coe won the 800m gold medal at the European Championships in Stuttgart, beating Tom McKean and Cram with a stunning last 200m of 24.8 and 100m of 12.4. It was his only 800m title at an international championship. He took the silver in the 1500m behind Cram, the mile world record holder proving too strong in the homestretch.  He then ran his personal best over 1500m with a 3:29.77 performance in Rieti, Italy, becoming the fourth man in history to break 3:30 at the distance. For the fourth year in his career (1979, 1981, 1982 & 1986), he was ranked No. 1 in the world at 800m, and he was in the top two for 1500m for the fifth time.

Coe sustained a foot injury in 1987 after winning an 800m and running a 4 × 400m leg for his club, Haringey, and was out for the entire season. The following year he was not selected for the British 1988 Olympic Games team after he failed to advance from the heats of the 1500m at the Trials in Birmingham. He had shown good early season form, but he picked up a chest infection after a spell of altitude training. The Daily Mirror ran a campaign and the president of the International Olympic Committee, Juan Antonio Samaranch, unsuccessfully tried to have the rules changed in Coe's favour. It was said that India was willing to include him on its national team on account of his mother's Indian heritage.

Coe had a final good season in 1989, when, in his 33rd year (at age 32), he won the AAA 1500m title, was ranked British number one for both 800m and 1500m, ran the world's second-fastest 800m of the year (1:43.38), and took the silver medal at the World Cup over 1500m. He retired from competitive athletics in early 1990, after having to bow out of the 1990 Commonwealth Games in Auckland, New Zealand with yet another chest infection. He ended his career having run sub-1:44 for 800m in eight different years.

Trinity College's Great Court Run
A scene in the 1981 film Chariots of Fire recreates a race in which competitors  attempt to run round the perimeter of the Great Court at Trinity College, Cambridge in the time it takes the clock to double-strike the hour at midday or midnight. Many have tried to run the  around the court in the 43.6 seconds that it takes to strike 12 o'clock. Known as the Great Court Run, students traditionally attempt to complete the circuit on the evening of the matriculation dinner. The only persons recognised to have actually completed the run in time are David Cecil in 1927 and Sam Dobin in 2007. It was thought that Coe had succeeded when he beat Steve Cram in a charity race in October 1988 in a time of 42.53 seconds. A video of the race, however, apparently shows that Coe was 12 metres short of the finish line when the last chime sounded, so Trinity College never officially accepted his time.

Political career
Coe was elected as Member of Parliament for Falmouth and Camborne in 1992, for the Conservative Party, but lost his seat in the 1997 general election. He returned to politics for a short time as Leader of the Opposition William Hague's chief of staff, having accepted the offer of a Life Peerage on 16 May 2000.

Sports administration career

London 2012 Olympic Games

When London announced its bid to hold the 2012 Olympics, Coe became an ambassador for the effort and a member of the board of the bid company. With the May 2004 resignation of chairman Barbara Cassani, Coe became the chairman for the latter phase of the bid. As Coe was a well-known personality in Olympic sport, it was felt he was better suited to the diplomatic finesse needed to secure the IOC's backing. Coe's presentation at the critical IOC meeting in July 2005 was viewed by commentators as being particularly effective, against tough competition from Paris and Madrid, and the London bid won the IOC's blessing on 6 July.

Coe attended the 2010 Winter Olympics held in Vancouver to see how the city coped with the challenges of hosting. Lord Coe noted the Games had "gradually recovered from its tumultuous start" and queried that he "never thought the British would find rivals in their preoccupation with the weather which is almost elevated to an Olympic event" as he credited VANOC for meeting unforeseen challenges such as the unseasonably warm weather of Cypress Mountain. Coe added "Rarely have I seen a host city so passionate and so ready to embrace the Games".

Coe was instrumental in asking Queen Elizabeth II to star in Happy and Glorious, a short film featuring James Bond, which formed part of the 2012 Summer Olympics opening ceremony. The director of the ceremony, Danny Boyle first pitched the idea to Coe, who loved it so much that he took it to Edward Young, Deputy Private Secretary to the Queen. A friend of Coe's from their days of advising William Hague, Young "listened sagely, laughed, and promised to ask the Boss". Word soon came back to Coe that she would love to take part.

FIFA
Coe was appointed the first chairman of FIFA's independent watchdog, the FIFA Ethics Committee. The commission will judge all cases alleging conflicts of interest and breaches of FIFA rules. FIFA president Sepp Blatter made the announcement in Zurich on 15 September 2006 and said: "It is perhaps a surprise but it has been very well received. We have found an outstanding personality in the world of sport, a great personality in the Olympic movement." His appointment makes him one of the most senior Englishmen to work for FIFA.

He stood down from this post to join the English committee that failed to bring the 2018 World Cup to England, with Russia chosen to host instead.

International Association of Athletics Federations
In 2007 Coe was appointed as vice President of the International Association of Athletics Federations (IAAF) and was reappointed in 2011. When Lamine Diack president of the IAAF announced that he was standing down in 2013 seemed likely to announce Coe as his successor as there had never been an election for the President position. Coe, in November 2014 announced that he would stand for election for this position in 2015. In December 2014, Coe unveiled his manifesto, ‘Growing Athletics in a New Age.' On 19 August 2015, in Beijing, he was elected president of IAAF against Sergey Bubka, by 115 votes to 92 votes.

In 2015 Lord Coe's presidency of IAAF created turmoil when major sponsor Adidas terminated a multimillion sponsorship deal four years early.

British Olympic Association
Following the London Olympics, Coe was appointed as Chairman of the British Olympic Association replacing Lord Moynihan.

Tokyo 2020 Olympic Games
Coe has been appointed a member of the Tokyo 2020 Olympic Games Coordination Commission representing the Association of National Olympic Committees.

International Olympic Committee
On 17 July 2020, Coe was elected a member of the International Olympic Committee.

Other sports
As of 2007, Coe was Patron of the British Dragon Boat Racing Association.

Russian doping scandal
The Digital, Culture, Media and Sport Committee in 2015 accused Coe of misleading the committee. He was also accused of blocking the release of a report from the University of Tübingen that mentioned the extent of doping

Personal life
After graduating in 1980, and a few months after his exploits on the track in the 1980–81 seasons, Coe got a job as a research assistant at the Loughborough University of Technology in the department of Physical Education and Sports Science. At this time he shared a semi-detached home with his close friend Steve Mitchell.

In 1990, when resident in Surrey, Coe married Nicky McIrvine, a former Badminton three-day-event champion, with whom he has two sons and two daughters. The marriage ended in divorce in 2002 after twelve years.

In 2003, Coe began a relationship with Carole Annett; the couple wed in 2011. She is the daughter of former England cricket captain M. J. K. Smith.

Coe is a worldwide ambassador for Nike and owns a string of health clubs with a membership of more than 20,000. He is a member of the East India Club, a private gentlemen's club in St James's Square. He has supported London athletic events such as the London 10K of Nike and the British 10K charity race. On 12 February 2010, Coe was the 19th runner on the 106th day of the Vancouver Olympic Torch Relay. Coe's leg was along the Stanley Park Seawall, and he exchanged a "torch kiss" with the previous runner, Arnold Schwarzenegger, and the next runner, a 19-year-old member of the Squamish community.

In October 2012, Coe was appointed chairman of Chime Communications sports marketing subsidiary, CSM Sport and Entertainment. The company also entered into an 'option agreement' to buy Coe's 93% interest in CLG, the firm which acts as a vehicle for his earnings from speeches and appearances.

Coe is a supporter of Chelsea Football Club. He is also a fan of cricket and jazz, in particular Billie Holiday and Lester Young.

Coe was featured in an episode of the BBC TV series Who Do You Think You Are?, which showed that he is descended from John Astley, the portrait painter, Jamaican sugar farmers and slave owners, George Clarke, Lieutenant Governor of New York Colony, and Edward Hyde of Norbury.

Coe retired from the House of Lords on 31 January 2022.

Coe is colour blind.

Honours
Coe was made an Honorary Doctor of Technology (Hon DTech) by his alma mater, Loughborough University in 1985. In November 2009, he was awarded an honorary degree as Doctor of Science (Hon DSc) from the University of East London. In 2009, he also was awarded an Honorary Fellow of the Royal Institute of British Architects. He also received an honorary Doctorate of Letters from the University of Sunderland in 2011.

He was appointed Member of the Order of the British Empire (MBE) in the 1982 New Year Honours and Officer of the Order of the British Empire (OBE) in the 1990 New Year Honours. On 16 May 2000, he was created a Life Peer as Baron Coe, of Ranmore in the County of Surrey. He was appointed Knight Commander of the Order of the British Empire (KBE) in the 2006 New Year Honours for services to sport. In the 2013 New Year Honours, Coe was appointed Member of the Order of the Companions of Honour (CH) for services to the London 2012 Olympic and Paralympic Games.

He was presented with the first Prince of Asturias Award (Sports category) in 1987. After his work in delivering London 2012 Coe was presented with an Olympic Order. Coe received another lifetime achievement award at the Laureus World Sport Awards.

Coe has also received three separate awards at the BBC Sports Personality of the Year ceremony: The main individual award in 1979, a "Special Gold Award" in 2005 and the "Lifetime Achievement Award" in 2012.

A building at the Nike world headquarters in Beaverton Oregon was named after Sebastian Coe in 2017. Coe is a longtime Nike athlete and was recognised by Nike as a great middle-distance runner. The 'Nike Sebastian Coe building' was designed to emphasise connectivity.

Coe was included in The Sunday Times''' "100 Makers of the 21st Century" list. In 2018 he was recognised as a Tourism Australia's Friend of Australia, in conjunction with the 2018 Gold Coast Commonwealth Games. In addition in 2018 Coe was awarded an OLY post nominal title from World Olympians Association.

Personal bests

(WR) indicates personal best which was also a World Record when set.

Journalism
He is a columnist for The Daily Telegraph''.

References

External links

 England Athletics Hall of Fame citation
 Parliament & the 2012 London Olympics - UK Parliament Living Heritage
 
 
 
 
 

1956 births
Living people
People from Hammersmith
Sportspeople from Sheffield
People from Stratford-upon-Avon
British sportsperson-politicians
Conservative Party (UK) MPs for English constituencies
Conservative Party (UK) life peers
Life peers created by Elizabeth II
English male middle-distance runners
Olympic athletes of Great Britain
Olympic gold medallists for Great Britain
Olympic silver medallists for Great Britain
Olympic gold medalists in athletics (track and field)
Olympic silver medalists in athletics (track and field)
English Olympic medallists
Athletes (track and field) at the 1980 Summer Olympics
Athletes (track and field) at the 1984 Summer Olympics
Commonwealth Games competitors for England
Athletes (track and field) at the 1986 Commonwealth Games
Athletes (track and field) at the 1990 Commonwealth Games
BBC Sports Personality of the Year winners
European Athletics Championships medalists
World record setters in athletics (track and field)
Presidents of the Organising Committees for the Olympic Games
British sports executives and administrators
English autobiographers
Members of the Parliament of the United Kingdom for constituencies in Cornwall
UK MPs 1992–1997
British politicians of Indian descent
English people of Indian descent
Athletes from London
Laureus World Sports Awards winners
Knights Commander of the Order of the British Empire
People in sports awarded knighthoods
Members of the Order of the Companions of Honour
International Olympic Committee members
Recipients of the Olympic Order
Recipients of the Paralympic Order
Fellows of the Royal Institute of British Architects
Alumni of Loughborough University
People educated at Tapton School
European champions for Great Britain
Presidents of the International Association of Athletics Federations
Track & Field News Athlete of the Year winners
BBC Sports Personality Lifetime Achievement Award recipients
Medalists at the 1980 Summer Olympics
Medalists at the 1984 Summer Olympics